Julia Hope Kamakia Paaikamokalani o Kinau Beckley Fayerweather Afong (February 1, 1840 – February 14, 1919) was a Hawaiian high chiefess who married Chinese millionaire merchant Chun Afong with whom she had sixteen children. She was of British, American and Hawaiian descent.

Life 
She was born on February 1, 1840, in Honolulu, Hawaiʻi, the first-born child and daughter of Abram Henry Fayerweather (1812–1850) and Mary Kekahimoku Kolimoalani Beckley (1820–1850). Her family was considered to be of the aliʻi (noble) class. She was the maternal granddaughter of British Captain George Charles Beckley and Ahia, a distant relation of the reigning House of Kamehameha and descendant of the 15th-century King Līloa. Her two sisters were Mary Jane Fayerweather Davison Montano (1840–1918), who married American pharmacist Benoni Richmond Davison and Colombian photographer Andreas Avelino Montano, and Hannah Fayerweather Bell (1843–1870), who married Thomas Kamukamu Bell. A brother named William Malulani Fayerweather (1841–1843) died young.

On May 28, 1857, she married Chinese millionaire merchant Chun Afong. The wedding ceremony was officiated by American Protestant missionary Reverend Lowell Smith. This marriage connected Afong to the reigning Kamehameha family and the ruling Hawaiian elite class. In 1874, her husband supported the political aspirations of Kalākaua (who shared a wet nurse with Julia and was considered a foster brother). Afong quietly gave financial support to Kalākaua in the election of 1874 against Queen Emma (the widow of Kamehameha IV). After the king's election, he appointed Afong to his Privy Council of State. The family business in Hawaiʻi steadily grew with investments in retail, shipping, opium sales, and sugar and coffee plantations.

After the death of Afong's eldest son Chun Alung in 1889, he sold or reorganized most of his business holdings in Hawaiʻi and invested in the Douglas Steamship Company in Hong Kong. He named Samuel Mills Damon as administrator of an estate left in Hawaiʻi to support Julia and their many children. Afong never returned to Hawaiʻi and died in Hong Kong in 1906.

Julia Afong died in Honolulu, at the age of 79, on February 14, 1919. She was buried at the Oahu Cemetery next to her son Jimmie.

Children

Julia and Afong had sixteen children. The following list of descendants are compiled from the family in Dye's Merchant Prince of the Sandalwood Mountains:

Their sixteen children included:
Emmeline Agatha Marie Kailimoku Afong (1858–1946), married firstly Henry Giles and had one daughter; and married secondly John Alfred Magoon and had seven children.
Antone "Toney" Abram Kekapala Keawemauhili Afong / Chun Chik-yu (1859–1936), married Julien Chang and had three children, Chun Wing-Sen, Irene Chun Wing-Luen, and Chun Wing-Keu. He served as governor of Guangdong from 1922 to 1923.
Nancy Eldorah Luhana Frederica Afong (1861–1940), married Francis Blately McStocker and had three children. Her husband served as chairman of the Executive Committee of the Annexation Club and helped form the Citizens' Guard, the armed militia of the Republic of Hawaiʻi.
Mary Catherine Afong (1862–1945), never married.
Julia Hope Afong (1864–1953), married Arthur Miller Johnstone and had eight children.
Marie K. Afong (1867–1925), married Abram Stephanus Humphreys and had four children.
Elizabeth K. Afong (1869–1965), married Ignatius R. Burns and had no children.
Henrietta (Etta) Patrinella Kealaiki Afong (1870–1940), married firstly United States Navy Rear Admiral William Henry Whiting and had a daughter; and married secondly Rear Admiral Ammen Farenholt and had no children.
Alice Lillian Afong (1872–1953), married Edson Lewis Hutchinson and had one son.
Helen Gertrude Afong (1873–1953), married firstly William A. Henshall and had one son; and married secondly George F. Henshall and had no children.
Caroline Bartlett Afong (1874–1942), married first Jacob Morton Riggs and married secondly Leonard Camp. No children from both marriages.
James "Jimmie" Edward Fayerweather Afong (1875–1875), died young.
Albert Fayerweather Leialoha Afong (1877–1948), married Anna Elizabeth Whiting and had four children: Elizabeth Kamakia Afong, Mary Katherine Afong, Katherine Whiting Afong, and Julia Fayerweather Afong. He became the first person of Chinese descent to head the Honolulu Stock Exchange. 
Martha Muriel Afong (1878–1983), married Andrew J. Dougherty and had three children.
Beatrice Melanie Afong (1880–1959), married firstly James Walter Wall Brewster and had two children; and married secondly Frank Moss and had no children.
Abram Henry Afong (1883–1933), married May Harvey and had one son Alvin Henry Afong.

Legacy

In 1909, Julia and Afong's life was fictionalized in the short magazine story, “Chun Ah Chun”, by American novelist Jack London. It was later published his 1912 book The House of Pride: And Other Tales of Hawaiʻi. London's highly embellished story of Afong depicts him as a "crafty coolie" who spites the white capitalist establishment through his own business success. He also entices white men with money to marry his racially-mixed daughters across the color-line. Julia was portrayed as "Stella Allendale, herself a subject of the brown-skinned king, though more of Anglo-Saxon blood ran in her veins than of Polynesian". In 1961, his great-grandson Eaton "Bob" Magoon Jr. wrote the book, music and lyrics to 13 Daughters, a short-lived Broadway musical. Don Ameche played the eponymous Chun while Monica Boyar portrayed his wife Emmaloa (based on Julia).

The site of the Afong family's Waikīkī villa, where royalty and dignitaries were entertained, was sold in 1904 to the United States Army Corps of Engineers for the construction of Battery Randolph and Battery Dudley, built to defend Honolulu Harbor from foreign attacks. It is now part of the property of the U.S. Army Museum of Hawaiʻi and Fort DeRussy Military Reservation. An informational marker describing the villa and Afong's legacy and is a stop on the Waikīkī Historic Trail.

Notes

References

Bibliography
Newspapers and online sources

Books and journals

Further reading

External links

People from Honolulu
Hawaiian Kingdom people
1840 births
1919 deaths
Burials at Oahu Cemetery